The Last Flight (Le dernier vol) is a 2009 French film. Directed by Karim Dridi, it stars Marion Cotillard and Guillaume Canet. The film is based on the French novel Le dernier vol de Lancaster by Sylvain Estibal which is loosely based on the real life events surrounding the disappearance of British aviator Bill Lancaster.

Synopsis
Aviator Marie Vallières de Beaumont (Cotillard) goes on a journey to find her lover Bill Lancaster after his plane disappears in the Sahara. After her plane is forced down in the Ténéré she meets Lieutenant Antoine Chauvet (Canet) of the French Camel Corps who joins in the hunt for Lancaster. As the two endure hardships in the desert, they begin to develop feelings for each other.

Cast
Marion Cotillard as Marie Vallières de Beaumont
Guillaume Canet as Antoine Chauvet
Frédéric Epaud as Louis
Michaël Vander-Meiren as Vasseur
Guillaume Marquet as Capatain Vincent Brosseau
Saïdou Abatcha as Saïddou

Production
Karim Dridi decided to develop the film after reading French journalist Sylvain Estibal's novel Le dernier vol de Lancaster. Dridi had travelled through the Sahara and was interested in making The Last Flight because he felt the novel could be made into a film that deviated from the normal conventions of the romantic epic. After he narrated the story to Marion Cotillard, she agreed to play Marie, a character loosely based on Lancaster's real-life lover, Chubbie Miller.

The Last Flight was originally scheduled to begin shooting in Niger, but due to safety concerns it was filmed in and around the Moroccan village of Merzouga. Due to the location change, Tuareg actors had to be brought in from Mali. For his role in the film as a French lieutenant who has assimilated to Tuareg culture, Guillaume Canet learned Tamasheq, the Tuareg language.

Reception

Critical response
The film received mixed reviews. While critics praised Antoine Monod's cinematography, they criticised the story for a perceived lack of originality, comparing it to The English Patient and The Sheltering Sky.

Box office
By 27 December it had earned only $2.8 million.

References

External links
 
 

2000s French-language films
2009 films
French films based on actual events
Films set in the French colonial empire
French drama films
Films set in Africa
Films directed by Karim Dridi
French aviation films
Films shot in Morocco
2009 drama films
2000s French films